Gwinear-Gwithian and St Erth was an electoral division of Cornwall in the United Kingdom which returned one member to sit on Cornwall Council between 2009 and 2021. It was abolished at the 2021 local elections, being succeeded by Gwinear-Gwithian and Hayle East and Long Rock, Marazion and St Erth.

Councillors

Extent
Gwinear-Gwithian and St Erth represented the town of St Erth, the villages of Fraddam, Gwithian, Connor Downs and Gwinear, and the hamlets of St Erth Praze, Reawla, Wall, Carnhell Green, Upton Towans and Calloose. It also covered the area of Godrevy (including, nominally, Godrevy Lighthouse), parts of the hamlets of Rose-an-Grouse and Canon's Town (both shared with Ludgvan division), the village of Leedstown (shared with Crowan and Wendron division), and most of the hamlet of Roseworthy (shared with Camborne Treswithian and, to a lesser extent, Camborne Pendarves).

The division was nominally abolished during boundary changes at the 2013 election, but this had little effect on the ward. From 2009 to 2013, the division covered 4407 hectares in total; after the boundary changes in 2013, it covered 4405 hectares.

Election results

2017 election

2013 election

2009 election

References

Electoral divisions of Cornwall Council